Threlkeldia  is a genus of annuals or short-lived perennials in the family Amaranthaceae. There are two species, both of which are endemic to Australia. Together they occur in all Australian states except Queensland.

Threlkeldia inchoata (J.M.Black) J.M.Black, which occurs in New South Wales and South Australia. 
Threlkeldia diffusa, known as coast bonefruit

References
 
 
PlantNET - New South Wales Flora Online: Genus Threlkeldia

Amaranthaceae
Amaranthaceae genera
Caryophyllales of Australia